Jeimer Candelario (born November 24, 1993) is an American professional baseball third baseman for the Washington Nationals of Major League Baseball (MLB). He has previously played in MLB for the Chicago Cubs and Detroit Tigers.

Early life
Candelario was born in New York City and moved to the Dominican Republic when he was five years old so that his father could open a baseball training center.

Career

Minors
Candelario signed with the Chicago Cubs in September 2010. He made his professional debut the next year with the Dominican Summer League Cubs. Candelario spent 2012 with the Boise Hawks of the Class A-Short Season Northwest League and the 2013 season with the Kane County Cougars of the Class A Midwest League. He spent 2014 with Kane County and the Daytona Cubs. He started 2015 with the Myrtle Beach Pelicans of the Class A-Advanced Carolina League and was promoted to the Tennessee Smokies of the Class AA Southern League during the season. The Cubs added him to their 40-man roster after the season.

With the Iowa Cubs in 2016, Candelario batted .333 in his first 25 games for the Iowa Cubs of the Class AAA Pacific Coast League.

Chicago Cubs
The Cubs promoted Candelario to the major league team on July 3, 2016, to replace Chris Coghlan, who was placed on the disabled list. He made his major-league debut the same day, against the New York Mets.  He was optioned back to Iowa on July 9. Candelario appeared in five games for the Cubs in 2016 and finished with a .091 batting average. The Cubs went on to win the 2016 World Series. Candelario was not included on the Cubs' postseason roster, but was still on the 40-man roster at the time and won his first World Series title.

Detroit Tigers
On July 31, 2017, Candelario was traded along with Isaac Paredes, and a player to be named later or cash considerations, to the Detroit Tigers in exchange for Alex Avila and Justin Wilson. The Tigers assigned him to the Toledo Mud Hens of the Class AAA International League. On August 7, the Tigers promoted Candelario to the major leagues from Toledo. With the 2017 Tigers, Candelario went 31-for-94 (.330) while hitting 2 home runs and driving in 13.

2018
Candelario began the 2018 as the Tigers regular third baseman. On May 14, he was placed on the 10-day disabled list with left wrist tendinitis. On May 26, in just his second game after returning from the disabled list, Candelario had the first multiple-homer game of his career as he went deep in his first two at-bats against Chicago White Sox starter Hector Santiago. For the 2018 season, Candelario hit .224 with 19 home runs and 54 RBI.

2019
In an 11-inning contest against the Toronto Blue Jays on March 31, 2019, Candelario had five hits in a game for the first time in his career. After struggling to a .192 batting average with 46 strikeouts in his first 146 at-bats of 2019, Candelario was optioned to the Triple-A Toledo Mud Hens. He would get called up towards the end of the season. Overall, he finished the season hitting .203 with 8 home runs and 32 RBI.

2020
Candelario began the 2020 season at third base for the Tigers, but was moved to first base following an injury to C. J. Cron. He was named AL Player of the Week for September 7–13, 2020, his first such honor. In eight games during the week, Candelario hit .423 (11-for-26) with four doubles, three home runs, nine RBIs, four walks and a .923 slugging percentage. During a doubleheader on September 10 (each game shortened to seven innings per 2020 MLB rules), Candelario hit a home run in each game, becoming the first Tiger to do so since Leonys Martín in 2018. For the 2020 season, Candelario hit .297 with seven home runs and 29 RBIs in 52 games, and led the Tigers with 21 extra-base hits.

2021
On January 15, 2021, the Tigers and Candelario agreed to a one-year, $2.85 million contract, avoiding arbitration. Candelario hit .271 for the season, with 16 home runs, 67 RBIs, and an MLB-leading 42 doubles. For the second straight season, Candelario led the Tigers in extra-base hits, with 61, and also finished with a team-best 3.2 Wins Above Replacement (WAR). Candelario was named Tiger of the Year for the second straight season by the Detroit chapter of the Baseball Writers' Association of America. He is the first player since Miguel Cabrera (2012 and 2013) to win this award in back-to-back seasons.

2022
On March 22, 2022, Candelario signed a one-year, $5.8 million contract with the Tigers, avoiding salary arbitration. On June 7, 2022 he was placed on the Tigers' 10-day IL with a left shoulder subluxation, retroactive to June 6, 2022. He hit .217 with 13 home runs and 50 RBIs for the 2022 season. On November 18, he was non tendered and became a free agent.

Washington Nationals
On November 29, 2022, Candelario signed a one-year contract for $5 million and another $1 million in achievable incentives with the Washington Nationals.

References

External links

 

1993 births
Living people
Águilas Cibaeñas players
American sportspeople of Dominican Republic descent
Boise Hawks players
Chicago Cubs players
Daytona Cubs players
Detroit Tigers players
Dominican Summer League Cubs players
Iowa Cubs players
Kane County Cougars players
Major League Baseball third basemen
Mesa Solar Sox players
Myrtle Beach Pelicans players
Baseball players from New York City
Tennessee Smokies players
Toledo Mud Hens players
Toros del Este players
2023 World Baseball Classic players